The KBO League Most Valuable Player Award is given to the player judged the most valuable player in the Korea Baseball Organization (KBO) League. The most recent winner is Lee Jung-hoo of the Kiwoom Heroes.

Award winners

References

KBO League trophies and awards
Baseball most valuable player awards
Most valuable player awards
South Korean awards